The women's shot put event at the 2001 Summer Universiade was held at the Workers Stadium in Beijing, China on 28 August.

Results

References

Athletics at the 2001 Summer Universiade
2001 in women's athletics
2001